Alexander Vargas Hernández (born May 28, 1977) is a retired Major League Baseball infielder and outfielder. He played during two seasons at the Major League level for the Pittsburgh Pirates. He was drafted by the Pirates in the 4th round of the 1995 amateur draft.

See also
 List of Major League Baseball players from Puerto Rico

References

1977 births
Living people
Altoona Curve players
Carolina Mudcats players
Chattanooga Lookouts players
Erie SeaWolves players
Gulf Coast Pirates players
Lancaster Barnstormers players
Leones de Ponce players
Louisville Bats players
Lynchburg Hillcats players
Major League Baseball first basemen
Major League Baseball left fielders
Major League Baseball players from Puerto Rico
Major League Baseball right fielders
Nashville Sounds players
Pittsburgh Pirates players
Somerset Patriots players